Joe F. Holsinger (January 20, 1904 – August 16, 1946) was an American football, basketball, and golf player and coach. Holsinger was a star athlete for the Kansas State Wildcats. He was then a backfield coach under Charlie Bachman for the Florida Gators, coaching the "Phantom Four" of 1928, and for the Michigan State Spartans. In 1935, he became the head basketball and golf coach for the Dayton Flyers.

References

External links
 

1904 births
1946 deaths
Florida Gators football coaches
Florida Gators men's golf coaches
Dayton Flyers men's basketball coaches
Michigan State Spartans football coaches
American football halfbacks
Kansas State Wildcats football players
Wisconsin Badgers football coaches